Francis Rufford (died 1854) was a British Conservative Party politician.

He was elected at the 1847 general election as a Member of Parliament for Worcester, and resigned from the House of Commons on 20 April 1852 through appointment as Steward of the Chiltern Hundreds.

References

External links 
 

Year of birth missing
1854 deaths
Conservative Party (UK) MPs for English constituencies
UK MPs 1847–1852